Hasan Kaan Özgönenç (born July 27, 1976, in Izmir) is an dinghy sailor from Turkey. He has competed in the Optimist (dinghy) and 470 (dinghy) class.

In 2001, he took the silver medal in the 470 class at 2001 Mediterranean Games with Selim Kakış.

He represented his country at 2004 Summer Olympics in the 470 class with Selim Kakış. They finished 24th.

References

1976 births
Living people
Olympic sailors of Turkey
Turkish male sailors (sport)
Sailors at the 2004 Summer Olympics – 470
Sportspeople from İzmir
Mediterranean Games silver medalists for Turkey
Competitors at the 2001 Mediterranean Games
Mediterranean Games medalists in sailing